The Togo women's national football team represents Togo in international women's football since 2006. It is governed by the Togolese Football Federation (FTF), the governing body of football in Togo. The team has played five FIFA-recognised matches, in 2006 and 2007, before reappearing in the 2018 WAFU Women's Cup, set in Abidjan, Ivory Coast. Their manager since January 2018 is Kaï Tomety. Togo's home stadium is the Stade de Kégué, located in Lomé.

Togo has never qualified for a FIFA World Cup but has qualified for the first Africa Women Cup of Nations in 2022. Currently, they are unranked on the FIFA Women's World Rankings for not having played more than five matches against officially ranked teams.

History
Togo did not compete in their first FIFA-sanctioned match until 2006, when they played five games. In their first game, on 19 February, Togo beat São Tomé and Príncipe 3–0. The team beat São Tomé and Príncipe again by a score of 6–0 on 26 February 2006 in Togo. In its next two games, Togo lost 0–9 and 1–3 to Congo. The team has since played just one match. In 2007, the team competed at the Tournoi de Cinq Nations held in Ouagadougou, Burkina Faso. There, Togo was paired with Mali and Ivory Coast on Pool B. The team lost 0–5 to Ivory Coast before being disqualified for bringing a club team, MBA Lomé, to the competition in violation of tournament rules.

The team was expected to participate in the 2010 African Women's Championship and was scheduled to play against Mali but withdrew before the competition started. The same occurred in the 2016 Africa Women Cup of Nations qualification process, where Togo was drawn with Algeria, but withdrew before playing any game. The team was replaced by Ethiopia, and were excluded from participating in the 2018 edition in Ghana.

Now coached by Kaï Tomety, the Éperviers Dames finally returned to the international competition in the maiden edition of the WAFU Women's Cup, after 11 years of absence. The performance of the new team, however, wasn't good as expected, since they were eliminated in the group stage after suffering heavy defeats to Senegal, Mali and Nigeria. Afi Woedikou scored Togo's only goal in the tournament against the latter, as result of a penalty kick.

Background and development
The national football association, the Togolese Football Federation, was founded in 1960 and became affiliated with FIFA in 1964. The organisation has fifteen staff members focusing on women's football. Football is the fourth-most-popular women's sport in Togo, trailing basketball, handball and volleyball. Football's popularity is growing, however. The country had 380 registered players in 2006, up from 180 in 2000. Women's football was first organised in the country in 2000. By 2006, there were 105 football clubs in Togo, 11 of which were for women only. A national women's competition was created by 2006 and was still operating in 2009. While there are no school, university or regional competitions for women's football, there was an active under-17 women's league in 2009. In 2010, a women's football competition involving 50 women's teams was organised by the German embassy, which provided teams with football kits and footballs.

Team image

Home stadium
The Togo women's national football team plays their home matches on the Stade de Kégué.

Results and fixtures
The following is a list of match results in the last 12 months, as well as any future matches that have been scheduled.

2022

2023

Source: global sport-

Coaching staff
 The current coaching staff was announced on 8 January 2018.

Players

  

Current squad
 Caps and goals accurate up to and including 30 October 2021.

 

 

 

 
 

 

Recent call-ups
The following players have been called up to a Togo  squad in the past 12 months.

 

 

 

Previous squads
 
Africa Women Cup of Nations
2022 Women's Africa Cup of Nations squads

Individual records
 Active players in bold, statistics correct as of 2020.

Most capped players

Top goalscorers

Managers

Honours

Achievements
Women's World Cup record

Olympic Games record

Africa Women Cup of Nations record

African Games record

Tournoi de Cinq Nations record

WAFU Women's Cup record

All−time record against FIFA recognized nations

Honours

All−time record against FIFA recognized nations
The list shown below shows the Djibouti national football team all−time international record against opposing nations.*As of xxxxxx after match against  xxxx.Key

Record per opponent*As ofxxxxx after match against  xxxxx.''
Key

The following table shows Djibouti's all-time official international record per opponent:

See also

 Sport in Togo
 Football in Togo
 Women's football in Togo

References

External links

Togo women's national football team
African women's national association football teams